Znamensky (masculine), Znamenskaya (feminine), or Znamenskoye (neuter) is the name of several  rural localities in Russia.

Chechen Republic
As of 2010, one rural locality in the Chechen Republic bears this name:
Znamenskoye, Chechen Republic, a selo in Znamenskaya Rural Administration of Nadterechny District

Kaliningrad Oblast
As of 2010, two rural localities in Kaliningrad Oblast bear this name:
Znamenskoye, Bagrationovsky District, Kaliningrad Oblast, a settlement in Gvardeysky Rural Okrug of Bagrationovsky District
Znamenskoye, Pravdinsky District, Kaliningrad Oblast, a settlement in Domnovsky Rural Okrug of Pravdinsky District

Kemerovo Oblast
As of 2010, one rural locality in Kemerovo Oblast bears this name:
Znamensky, Kemerovo Oblast, a settlement in Osinogrivskaya Rural Territory of Topkinsky District

Krasnodar Krai
As of 2010, one rural locality in Krasnodar Krai bears this name:
Znamensky, Krasnodar Krai, a settlement in Pashkovsky Rural Okrug under the administrative jurisdiction of the City of Krasnodar

Kursk Oblast
As of 2010, two rural localities in Kursk Oblast bear this name:
Znamensky, Kursk Oblast, a settlement in Vyshnedubovetsky Selsoviet of Medvensky District
Znamenskoye, Kursk Oblast, a selo in Shchegolyansky Selsoviet of Belovsky District

Lipetsk Oblast
As of 2010, three rural localities in Lipetsk Oblast bear this name:
Znamenskoye, Izmalkovsky District, Lipetsk Oblast, a selo in Vasilyevsky Selsoviet of Izmalkovsky District
Znamenskoye, Lev-Tolstovsky District, Lipetsk Oblast, a selo in Znamensky Selsoviet of Lev-Tolstovsky District
Znamenskaya, Lipetsk Oblast, a village in Balovnevsky Selsoviet of Dankovsky District

Mari El Republic
As of 2010, one rural locality in the Mari El Republic bears this name:
Znamensky, Mari El Republic, a settlement in Znamensky Rural Okrug of Medvedevsky District

Republic of Mordovia
As of 2010, two rural localities in the Republic of Mordovia bear this name:
Znamenskoye, Atyashevsky District, Republic of Mordovia, a selo in Pokrovsky Selsoviet of Atyashevsky District
Znamenskoye, Chamzinsky District, Republic of Mordovia, a selo in Michurinsky Selsoviet of Chamzinsky District

Moscow Oblast
As of 2010, three rural localities in Moscow Oblast bear this name:
Znamenskoye, Kashirsky District, Moscow Oblast, a village in Znamenskoye Rural Settlement of Kashirsky District
Znamenskoye, Odintsovsky District, Moscow Oblast, a selo in Gorskoye Rural Settlement of Odintsovsky District
Znamenskaya, Moscow Oblast, a village in Savvinskoye Rural Settlement of Yegoryevsky District

Nizhny Novgorod Oblast
As of 2010, three rural localities in Nizhny Novgorod Oblast bear this name:
Znamensky, Nizhny Novgorod Oblast, a settlement in Svetlogorsky Selsoviet of Shatkovsky District
Znamenskoye, Pilninsky District, Nizhny Novgorod Oblast, a selo in Medyansky Selsoviet of Pilninsky District
Znamenskoye, Voskresensky District, Nizhny Novgorod Oblast, a selo in Blagoveshchensky Selsoviet of Voskresensky District

Novgorod Oblast
As of 2010, one rural locality in Novgorod Oblast bears this name:
Znamenskoye, Novgorod Oblast, a village in Bykovskoye Settlement of Pestovsky District

Omsk Oblast
As of 2010, one rural locality in Omsk Oblast bears this name:
Znamenskoye, Omsk Oblast, a selo in Znamensky Rural Okrug of Znamensky District

Oryol Oblast
As of 2010, seven rural localities in Oryol Oblast bear this name:
Znamenskoye, Bolkhovsky District, Oryol Oblast, a village in Novosinetsky Selsoviet of Bolkhovsky District
Znamenskoye, Dolzhansky District, Oryol Oblast, a selo in Kozma-Demyanovsky Selsoviet of Dolzhansky District
Znamenskoye, Kolpnyansky District, Oryol Oblast, a selo in Znamensky Selsoviet of Kolpnyansky District
Znamenskoye, Mtsensky District, Oryol Oblast, a selo in Vysokinsky Selsoviet of Mtsensky District
Znamenskoye, Orlovsky District, Oryol Oblast, a selo in Bolshekulikovsky Selsoviet of Orlovsky District
Znamenskoye, Sverdlovsky District, Oryol Oblast, a selo in Nikolsky Selsoviet of Sverdlovsky District
Znamenskoye, Znamensky District, Oryol Oblast, a selo in Znamensky Selsoviet of Znamensky District

Penza Oblast
As of 2010, two rural localities in Penza Oblast bear this name:
Znamenskoye, Bashmakovsky District, Penza Oblast, a selo in Znamensky Selsoviet of Bashmakovsky District
Znamenskoye, Mokshansky District, Penza Oblast, a selo in Plessky Selsoviet of Mokshansky District

Saratov Oblast
As of 2010, one rural locality in Saratov Oblast bears this name:
Znamensky, Saratov Oblast, a settlement in Ivanteyevsky District

Sverdlovsk Oblast
As of 2010, two rural localities in Sverdlovsk Oblast bear this name:
Znamenskoye, Irbitsky District, Sverdlovsk Oblast, a selo in Irbitsky District
Znamenskoye, Sukholozhsky District, Sverdlovsk Oblast, a selo in Sukholozhsky District

Tula Oblast
As of 2010, four rural localities in Tula Oblast bear this name:
Znamensky, Tula Oblast, a settlement in Shirinsky Rural Okrug of Novomoskovsky District
Znamenskoye, Kurkinsky District, Tula Oblast, a selo in Mikhaylovskaya Volost of Kurkinsky District
Znamenskoye, Suvorovsky District, Tula Oblast, a selo in Balevskaya Rural Territory of Suvorovsky District
Znamenskoye, Yasnogorsky District, Tula Oblast, a selo in Znamenskaya Rural Territory of Yasnogorsky District

Tver Oblast
As of 2010, four rural localities in Tver Oblast bear this name:
Znamenskoye, Oleninsky District, Tver Oblast, a selo in Oleninsky District
Znamenskoye, Rzhevsky District, Tver Oblast, a village in Rzhevsky District
Znamenskoye, Staritsky District, Tver Oblast, a village in Staritsky District
Znamenskoye, Toropetsky District, Tver Oblast, a village in Toropetsky District

Vladimir Oblast
As of 2010, one rural locality in Vladimir Oblast bears this name:
Znamenskoye, Vladimir Oblast, a village in Kirzhachsky District

Vologda Oblast
As of 2010, one rural locality in Vologda Oblast bears this name:
Znamenskoye, Vologda Oblast, a settlement in Sukhonsky Selsoviet of Mezhdurechensky District

Yaroslavl Oblast
As of 2010, one rural locality in Yaroslavl Oblast bears this name:
Znamenskoye, Yaroslavl Oblast, a village in Klimatinsky Rural Okrug of Uglichsky District